Regional Mexican is a Latin music radio format encompassing the musical genres from the different parts of rural Mexico and the Southwestern United States. Genres include banda, country en español, Duranguense, grupero, mariachi, New Mexico music, Norteño, Tejano, Tierra Caliente and others.  It is among the most popular radio formats targeting Mexican Americans in the United States. 

The popularity of each subgenre varies by region in Mexico and the United States. 

Within their respective genres, Regional Mexican artists perform different styles of songs such as rancheras, corridos, cumbias, boleros, ballads, among others.

Like Country and Sertanejo music, Regional Mexican artists are characterized for their use of Western wear.

Related formats
Uforia Audio Network owns a number of stations running the Regional Mexican format.

See also
Grammy Award for Best Regional Mexican Music Album (including Tejano)
Latin Grammy Award for Best Regional Mexican Song
Mexican music in Chile
Monitor Latino, a music chart which provides Regional Mexican music charts for Mexico, the United States and Guatemala.
Regional Mexican Albums
Regional Mexican Airplay, a music chart by Billboard.

References

External links
Radioandrecords.com: Regional Mexican Airplay Charts — from Radio & Records, based on Regional Mexican Airplay panel data.

 01
Radio formats
Radio in Mexico
Spanish-language radio in the United States

Mexican-American culture